György Révész (1927–2003) was a Hungarian screenwriter and film director.

Selected filmography
Director
 Before Midnight (1957)
 Danger on the Danube (1961)
 Fagyosszentek (1962)
 Kakuk Marci (1973)
 The Pendragon Legend (1974)
 Akli Miklós (1986)

Bibliography
 Burns, Bryan. World Cinema: Hungary. Fairleigh Dickinson University Press, 1996.

External links

1927 births
2003 deaths
Male screenwriters
Hungarian male writers
Hungarian film directors
Writers from Budapest
20th-century Hungarian screenwriters